Chen Te-tung (born October 15, 1985) is a Taiwanese former swimmer, who specialized in freestyle events. Chen qualified for two swimming events, as a member of the Chinese Taipei team, at the 2004 Summer Olympics in Athens. He posted FINA B-standard entry times of 1:53.29 (200 m freestyle) and 4:02.24 (400 m freestyle) from the National University Games in Taipei. On the first day of the Games, Chen placed fortieth in the 400 m freestyle. He pulled off a second-place effort in heat one by a 1.72-second margin behind Philippines' Miguel Mendoza with a time of 4:03.71. The following day, Chen delivered a forty-seventh-place finish in the 200 m freestyle. Swimming in heat three, he raced to a sixth seed by 0.24 of a second behind Cyprus' Alexandros Aresti in 1:54.14.

References

1985 births
Living people
Taiwanese male freestyle swimmers
Olympic swimmers of Taiwan
Swimmers at the 2004 Summer Olympics
Swimmers at the 2006 Asian Games
Asian Games competitors for Chinese Taipei